Eunidia spinicornis is a species of beetle in the family Cerambycidae. It was described by Péringuey in 1888.

References

Eunidiini
Beetles described in 1888